Cladonia macilenta or the lipstick cup lichen is a species of cup lichen in the family Cladoniaceae.

The species is red listed in Iceland as an endangered species (EN).

Verrucaster lichenicola, described by Friedrich Tobler in 1913, was proposed to be a fungus with waxy pycnidia and hyaline conidia lacking septa. It was, however, a little-known taxon, as the type specimen was lost and not collected again. The rediscovery of the type material more than a century later revealed that what Tobler thought to be a lichenicolous fungus was instead pycnidia of Cladonia malienta, and thus the two taxa are placed in synonymy.

References

macilenta
Taxa named by Georg Franz Hoffmann